RDP África is a terrestrial radio station owned by Rádio e Televisão de Portugal broadcasting to Lusophone African countries with programming such as Lusophone African music, as well as Portuguese music and Brazilian music, with update reports from the Lusophone African recording world.

The station broadcasts on FM in Portugal (Lisboa 101.5 MHz, Coimbra 103.4 MHz and Faro 99.1 MHz), but also on most African Portuguese-speaking countries: Cape Verde, Guinea-Bissau, Mozambique, and São Tomé and Príncipe.

RDP África was introduced to Lusophone Africa when RDP Internacional stopped its broadcast on 6 January 1998 and launched RDP África the next day. The radio station also serves the Portuguese populations of Lusophone Africa and African populations of both black, white, and mulatto blood of Portugal.

External links
RDP África Website
FM, DAB and satellite transmitting network
RDP África Live Stream on RTP Play

International broadcasters
Radio stations in Angola
Radio stations in Cape Verde
Radio stations in Guinea-Bissau
Radio stations in Mozambique
Radio stations in Portugal
Radio stations in São Tomé and Príncipe
Portuguese-language radio stations
Rádio e Televisão de Portugal
1998 establishments in Portugal
Radio stations established in 1998